Efraín Nieves (born November 15, 1989) is a Puerto Rican professional baseball pitcher who is a free agent. He has played in the Chinese Professional Baseball League (CPBL) for the Lamigo Monkeys.

Career

Milwaukee Brewers
Nieves attended the Puerto Rico Baseball Academy. The Milwaukee Brewers drafted Nieves in the seventh round of the 2007 Major League Baseball draft. After playing rookie ball in 2007 and 2008, Nieves was promoted to the Single-A Wisconsin Timber Rattlers for the 2009 season. He would spend the entire 2010 season for the Timber Rattlers as well, pitching to a 5.56 ERA with 53 strikeouts and 41 walks. Nieves was promoted to the advanced Single-A Brevard County Manatees in 2011, where he spent the season. On March 26, 2012, Nieves was released by the Brewers.

Detroit Tigers
On April 24, 2012, Nieves signed a minor league contract with the Detroit Tigers organization. Nieves spent the year with the low Single-A Connecticut Tigers and re-signed with the Tigers on a minor league contract on November 26.

Toronto Blue Jays
On December 6, 2012, Nieves was selected by the Toronto Blue Jays in the minor league phase of the Rule 5 Draft. Nieves spent the 2013 season with the Single-A Lansing Lugnuts and the advanced Single-A Dunedin Blue Jays. Nieves remained in Dunedin in 2014 and became a free agent after the season.

Texas Rangers
On November 20, 2014, Nieves signed a minor league contract with the Texas Rangers organization. Nieves was released before the season on March 4, 2015.

Evansville Otters
Nieves signed with the Evansville Otters of the Frontier League following his release from the Rangers organization. In his first Frontier League start on May 20, 2015, Nieves pitched six innings of one hit, no runs ball with five strikeouts.

Somerset Patriots
On April 9, 2016, Nieves signed with the Somerset Patriots of the Atlantic League of Professional Baseball.

Lamigo Monkeys
On May 28, 2016, Nieves signed with the Lamigo Monkeys of the Chinese Professional Baseball League.

Somerset Patriots (second stint)
On June 22, 2017, Nieves signed with the Somerset Patriots of the Atlantic League of Professional Baseball. Nieves pitched to a 3.95 ERA with 63 strikeouts in 73.0 innings pitched across 16 games.

International career
Nieves played for the Puerto Rican national baseball team in the 2013 World Baseball Classic. He was selected to Puerto Rico's roster for the 2019 Pan American Games.

References

External links

1989 births
Living people
People from Caguas, Puerto Rico
Baseball pitchers
Baseball players at the 2019 Pan American Games
Central American and Caribbean Games gold medalists for Puerto Rico
Pan American Games gold medalists for Puerto Rico
Pan American Games medalists in baseball
Puerto Rican baseball players
2013 World Baseball Classic players
Arizona League Brewers players
Helena Brewers players
Lobos de Arecibo players
Wisconsin Timber Rattlers players
Senadores de San Juan players
Brevard County Manatees players
Criollos de Caguas players
Connecticut Tigers players
Lansing Lugnuts players
Dunedin Blue Jays players
Lamigo Monkeys players
Competitors at the 2018 Central American and Caribbean Games
Central American and Caribbean Games medalists in baseball
Medalists at the 2019 Pan American Games
Liga de Béisbol Profesional Roberto Clemente pitchers
Puerto Rican expatriate baseball players in Taiwan
Atenienses de Manatí (baseball) players
Cangrejeros de Santurce (baseball) players
Puerto Rican expatriate baseball players in Venezuela
Somerset Patriots players
Tiburones de Aguadilla players